Fraser Watts (born 5 June 1979) is a Scottish cricketer. He is a right-handed batsman.  He began his cricket career playing for Carlton Cricket Club in Edinburgh.  He demonstrated significant potential early on and when aged 16 won a sports scholarship to Durham School where he completed the last 2 years of his education. Watts has returned to play for Carlton, following a stint at Greenock, in the SNCL and also enjoyed a stint as the opening batsman for the Scottish national team.  He was part of the Scottish team that travelled to the West Indies for the Cricket World Cup in 2007.  He played in two of their group games but had to pull out of their final game at the last minute due to a groin strain on the morning of the match.

He was educated at South Morningside Primary, Boroughmuir High School, Durham School and then Loughborough University.

As a batsman, Watts is renowned for his flowing locks and cover drives. Formerly a seam bowler, he once removed Dan Marsh twice during a six wicket haul against Leicestershire CCC whilst playing for Loughborough University; however he has since failed to get a bowl for any of his club sides in Scotland.

Watts was voted 24th most eligible bachelor in Scotland in a Scotland on Sunday special feature in 2006.

In 2013, Fraser announced his retirement from International Cricket. Since his retirement from international cricket, Fraser has continued to turn out at club level for Carlton Cricket Club.

Apart from cricket he enjoys many other sports, including golf and football.

References

External links

1979 births
Living people
Alumni of Loughborough University
Cricketers from King's Lynn
Scotland One Day International cricketers
Scotland Twenty20 International cricketers
Scottish cricketers
People educated at Durham School